Nowon station is a station on the Seoul Subway Line 4 and Line 7.  The station on Line 4 is elevated whereas the station on Line 7 is underground, owing to the elevated tracks of Line 4 between Danggogae station and Chang-dong station. In addition, the two stations are far apart, making passengers walk a considerable distance for transfers.

Many restaurants, bars, pubs, as well as many clothing shops, accessory shops, beauty salons are located around Nowon Station.  The Lotte Department Store is directly accessible from the Line 7 station.

Both the Line 4 and Line 7 stations are located in Sanggye-dong, Nowon-gu, Seoul.

Station layout

Line 4

Line 7

Gallery

References 

Railway stations in South Korea opened in 1985
Seoul Metropolitan Subway stations
Metro stations in Nowon District